The Gaddi is a semi-pastoral Indo-Aryan ethno-linguistic tribe living mainly in the Indian states of Himachal Pradesh and Jammu and Kashmir. 

 The Gaddis are largely dependent on primary activities such as sheep and goat rearing and they have maintained a unique and distinct identity in the Indian Himalayan Region because they practiced Transhumance and communicated through Gaddiali Dialect.

Overview
The origin of the Gaddi tribe is bharmour. They also additionally believe that their ancestors fled from plains because of lack of security or foreign Invasions. The fact regarding their origination lies within the popular myths in the state. There is no accord of the views from where Gaddis migrated to this hilly state.

Bharmour is additionally known as the abode of Gaddis. Hinduism is the only religion followed by Gaddis, who see maintaining festivals and religious traditions as an important aspect of upholding culture, despite being nomadic. These views are commonly held among these folks like Kailash is the throne (gadi) of the Lord Shiva. Therefore, those people who took refuge and settled in Bharmaur also came to be referred as Gaddis.

Gaddis are semi nomadic, semi-agricultural and a semi-pastoral tribe. They have a defined culture, expressed through language, dress, food, marriage, song, and devout celebrations. Gaddis have their empyreal history deep- rooted in their endemic culture. In order to preserve their cultural heritage, they take pride in their culture and maintain cultural coherence from generation to generation. Gaddi is the language of Gaddi community and Tankri is the script used by the old people of the community. Other     people spoke Hindi, whereas Devanagari is used as a script
Caste system prevalent in gaddi community.  They are classified as a Scheduled Tribe in both areas under India's reservation system.

Gallery

References

External links
 Gabdika.com

Social groups of Jammu and Kashmir
Scheduled Tribes of Jammu and Kashmir
Scheduled Tribes of Himachal Pradesh
Transhumant ethnic groups